Zahurul Islam Khan Bikalpa Dhara Bangladesh politician. He was elected a member of parliament from Mymensingh-9 in February 1996.

Career 
Khan was elected to parliament from Mymensingh-9 as a Bangladesh Nationalist Party candidate in 15 February 1996 Bangladeshi general election.

He joined the Jatiya Party and was defeated by Mymensingh-9 seat in the seventh election on 12 June 1996. He joined the Bikalpa Dhara Bangladesh party in 2004 and lost the Mymensingh-9 seat in the 2008 ninth national election.

References 

Living people
Year of birth missing (living people)
People from Mymensingh District
Bikalpa Dhara Bangladesh politicians
Bangladesh Nationalist Party politicians
Jatiya Party politicians
6th Jatiya Sangsad members